The Paris Lakers were a minor league baseball team based in Paris, Illinois from 1950 to 1959. The Lakers played as members of the Midwest League from 1956 to 1959 and its predecessor, the Mississippi–Ohio Valley League from 1950 to 1955. The Lakers won the first Midwest League championship in 1956. The Paris Lakers were a minor league affiliate of the Chicago Cubs from 1955 to 1959.

History
The Lakers were preceded in Paris, Illinois by the 1908 Paris Parisians, who played as a member of the Class D level Eastern Illinois League.

The Paris Lakers were an original franchise in the 1956 Midwest League, having previously had played in the Mississippi–Ohio Valley League, the predecessor of the Midwest League.

From 1950 to 1954, the Lakers played as a non-affiliated team, and from 1955 to 1959, they were affiliated with the Chicago Cubs.

Paris finished 85–42 in the 1952 Mississippi–Ohio Valley League, to place 2nd. Their manager from 1950 to 1954 was Paris native Tom Sunkel.

The Lakers won the first ever Midwest League championship in 1956, defeating the Dubuque Packers 3 games to 1 in the Finals.
 
On August 18, 1957 Kenneth Rollins threw a no-hitter against the Michigan City White Caps, winning 12–0.

The ballpark
The Lakers' home field was Laker Stadium. Laker Stadium hosted the 1951 Mississippi–Ohio Valley League All-Star Game. The ballfield and part of the original stands are still in use today at the stadium, which sits within Twin Lakes Park. The address is 137 West Steidl Road, Paris, Illinois.

Timeline

Year–by–year records

Notable alumni

Tony Balsamo (1959)
Doc Bracken (1953–1954)
Harvey Branch (1958–1959)
Dick Burwell (1959)
John Buzhardt (1955)
Jack Curtis (1956)
Dave Gerard (baseball) (1955)
Bob Giggie (1951)
Lou Johnson (1958)
Mike Krsnich (1950–1951)
Nelson Mathews (1959)
Moe Morhardt (1959)
Don Prince (1958)
Marty Purtell (1956, MGR)
Joe Schaffernoth (1956)
Johnnie Seale (1959)
Quincy Smith (1951–1954)
Morrie Steevens (1959)
Tom Sunkel (1950–1954, MGR)
Harry Taylor (1955)
Verlon Walker (1957–1959, MGR)
Jim Zapp (1952)

See also
Paris Lakers players

References

Defunct Midwest League teams
Chicago Cubs minor league affiliates
Professional baseball teams in Illinois
1950 establishments in Illinois
1959 disestablishments in Illinois
Mississippi-Ohio Valley League
Defunct minor league baseball teams
Baseball teams established in 1950
Defunct baseball teams in Illinois
Baseball teams disestablished in 1959